Myumyun Kashmer (born 20 January 1962), also known under his Bulgarian passport name Milan Kashmerov, is a former Bulgarian footballer of Turkish descent, who played as a forward.

Honours

Club
Lokomotiv Sofia
 Bulgarian Cup: 1982

Levski Sofia
 A Group: 1984–85

Beroe Stara Zagora
 A Group: 1985–86

External links

 Profile at LevskiSofia.info

1962 births
Living people
Bulgarian footballers
Association football forwards
First Professional Football League (Bulgaria) players
Primeira Liga players
Süper Lig players
FC Lokomotiv 1929 Sofia players
PFC Levski Sofia players
PFC Beroe Stara Zagora players
Portimonense S.C. players
1. FC Union Berlin players
Bursaspor footballers
Konyaspor footballers
Bulgarian expatriate footballers
Expatriate footballers in Portugal
Bulgarian expatriate sportspeople in Portugal
Expatriate footballers in Germany
Bulgarian expatriate sportspeople in Germany
Expatriate footballers in Turkey
Bulgarian expatriate sportspeople in Turkey